John Silver may refer to:
John Silver (wrestler) (born 1991), American professional wrestler
John Silver (politician) (died 1724), Irish member of parliament
John Silver (musician) (born 1950), second drummer for the English rock band Genesis
John Silver (pigeon), a war pigeon active with the United States Army in World War I
"John Silver" (song), a 1938 song by Jimmy Dorsey
Long John Silver, a fictional character from the novel Treasure Island
John Silver (cigarette), a Swedish brand of cigarettes